Diana Weston (born 13 November 1953 in Toronto, Ontario, Canada) is a Canadian-British actress who has been on British television since 1975. She is a grandchild of Charles Basil Price.

Biography

Career
Weston's first role was in a 1975 episode of Thriller, and parts in Raffles, The Sweeney, The Professionals, Agony, Shoestring and Bless Me, Father soon followed. She also appeared in the video for the 1984 Ultravox hit single Dancing with Tears in My Eyes. Since the late 1980s, she has appeared in The New Statesman, Boon, A Bit of a Do, About Face, Nightingales, Jonathan Creek, Casualty, Emmerdale, My Family, New Tricks and a main role in the 2000 sitcom Pay and Display.

However, it is for the role of Caroline in the sitcom The Upper Hand that she is best known, starring alongside Joe McGann and Honor Blackman, with the show being produced for ITV from 1990 to 1996.

Filmography

Film

Television

Personal life
Diana Weston had a long relationship with the actor Robert Lindsay, and they had one daughter, Sydney (born 1988), who has also made television appearances. She and Lindsay separated after he started a relationship with actress/presenter Rosemarie Ford, although she continued to work with him on occasion.

References

External links

1953 births
Living people
Actresses from Toronto
English stage actresses
English television actresses